This is a list of notable events relating to the environment in 1984. They relate to environmental law, conservation, environmentalism and environmental issues.

Events

January
 The Eagle Mine in the U.S. state of Colorado was closed down. It was responsible for acid mine drainage polluting the Eagle River.

December
The Bhopal disaster, considered one of the world's worst industrial catastrophes, occurred on the night of December 2–3 at the Union Carbide India Limited pesticide plant in Bhopal, Madhya Pradesh, India. A leak of methyl isocyanate gas and other chemicals from the plant resulted in the exposure of the gas to hundreds of thousands of people. Thousands of people died.

See also

Human impact on the environment
List of environmental issues